This is a list of dune systems around the Welsh coast. Wales' dune systems are of interest to geomorphologists and ecologists as both landforms and ecosystems. Individual systems are referred to variously as warren, burrows or 'morfa' (Welsh plural: morfeydd) which signifies a 'sea-marsh' or 'salt-marsh', the two landforms typically existing alongside one another.

Aberffraw Bay
Barmouth
Borth
Castlemartin
Crymlyn Burrows (SSSI)
Cymyran Bay
Dyffryn Ardudwy
Harlech
Kenfig (SSSI)
Laugharne
Llangenith
Merthyr Mawr (SSSI)
Mumbles
Newborough Warren
Oxwich (SSSI)
Pembrey
Penally
Port Eynon
Port Talbot
Prestatyn
Tremadog Bay
Trewent
Tywyn
Whiteford Burrows
Whitesands Bay

References

Lists of landforms of Wales